A referendum was held in France on 20 and 21 December 1851. Voters were asked whether they approved of the continuation of the authority of Louis Napoléon Bonaparte and to delegate the powers required to produce a new constitution. It was approved by 92% of voters with an 81.7% turnout.

Results

92.03% of French voters voted in favor of the amendment, while 18.35% of electors abstained from voting. The official tally and free nature of the vote were questioned by dissidents like Victor Hugo.

References

French Second Republic
Referendums in France
1851 in France
1851 referendums
Constitutional referendums in France
December 1851 events